Oeko-Tex is a registered trade mark, representing the product labels and company certifications issued and other services provided by the International Association for Research and Testing in the Field of Textile and Leather Ecology (which also calls itself Oeko-Tex for short).

The Oeko-Tex Association issues the product-related labels Standard 100 by Oeko-Tex (formerly Oeko-Tex Standard 100), Made in Green by Oeko-Tex (formerly Oeko-Tex Standard 100plus) and Leather Standard by Oeko-Tex, the label Eco Passport by Oeko-Tex for chemicals to be used in textile production, and the STeP by Oeko-Tex label (formerly Oeko-Tex Standard 1000) and the Detox to Zero status report for production facilities.

Oeko-Tex labels and certificates confirm the human-ecological safety of textile products and leather articles from all stages of production (raw materials and fibres, yarns, fabrics, ready-to-use end products) along the textile value chain. Some also attest to socially and environmentally sound conditions in production facilities.

Organization 
The International Association for Research and Testing in the Field of Textile and Leather Ecology (Oeko-Tex) with headquarters in Zürich (Switzerland) was founded in 1992. Founding members were the German Hohenstein Institute and the Austrian Textile Research Institute (OETI). Currently, the Oeko-Tex Association includes 18 neutral test and research institutes in Europe and Japan with contact offices in over 70 countries around the world.

Oeko-Tex Certificates

Standard 100 by Oeko-Tex 

The Standard 100 by Oeko-Tex product label, introduced (as Oeko-Tex Standard 100) in 1992, certifies adherence to the specifications of the standard by the same name, a document of testing methods and limit values for potentially harmful chemicals. This independent testing and certification system may be applied to textile materials, intermediate products at all stages of production and ready-made textile articles. Examples of eligible items for certification are raw and dyed finished yarns, raw and dyed finished fabrics and knits, and consumer goods (all types of clothing, home and household textiles, bed linen, terry cloth items, textile toys and more).

Objective 
The Standard 100 by Oeko-Tex aims at making it obvious to consumers that the labeled textile products have undergone laboratory testing for a wide range of harmful substances, and that the content of those substances remains below the limit values established by the Oeko-Tex Association.

The introduction of the standard established a globally standardized quality assurance system for manufacturers and retailers, taking into account the decreased vertical range of manufacture in the individual facilities of the textile and clothing industry, and compensating for regionally different evaluation standards for the risk potential of harmful substances. Use of the Oeko-Tex certificate documents compliance with human-ecological requirements to subsequent production levels and consumers. The requirements for obtaining the certificate are updated at least once a year based on new scientific information.

Prerequisites 
Textile products can only be certified according to the Standard 100 by Oeko-Tex if all components comply with the required criteria – for an item of clothing, in addition to the outer fabric, this might include threads, linings, prints as well as non-textile accessories such as buttons, zip fasteners, rivets or any other accessory parts.

Extent and requirements of Oeko-Tex testing for harmful substances depend on the intended use of a textile product. There are four product classes:
 Product class I – Items for babies and infants (up to 36 months of age)
 Product class II – Items with direct prolonged or large-area skin contact
 Product class III – Textiles without or with little skin contact
 Product class IV – Furnishing materials for decorative purposes (curtains, table linen, carpets, etc.)

Product class I requirements are more rigorous for most potentially harmful substances, and there is an additional test for saliva resistance.

Laboratory tests 
Test criteria and limit values are globally binding and are updated and expanded each year. The current version of the Standard 100 is available at the official website. Test parameters include substances banned or regulated by law as well as yet unregulated substances that are known to be problematic.

Textile products are tested for their content of several hundred individual substances from 17 groups of chemicals. The standard takes into account:
 Important legal regulations (e.g. banned Azo dyes, formaldehyde, pentachlorophenol, cadmium, nickel)
 Requirements of Annexes XVII and XIV of the European Chemicals Regulation REACh and of the ECHA SVHC Candidate List that are assessed to be relevant for fabrics, textiles, garments or accessories by expert groups of the Oeko-Tex Association
 US Consumer Product Safety Improvement Act (CPSIA) requirements regarding lead
 Numerous other environmentally relevant substance classes
 Numerous substances known to be harmful to health or environmentally relevant but not yet subject to any regulation
Furthermore, all tested items must have a skin-friendly pH value and good color fastness. They are tested for emissions of volatile chemicals and are subjected to an olfactory test.

Once issued, the Oeko-Tex certificate is valid for one year.

Prevalence and awareness 
The Standard 100 by Oeko-Tex is the product label for textiles tested for harmful substances with the largest prevalence worldwide. More than 10,000 manufacturers in almost 100 countries currently participate in Oeko-Tex certification. To date, the Oeko-Tex Association has issued over 160,000 Standard 100 certificates for textile products from all stages of production (as of 12/2015).

According to a consumer survey by GfK in 2006, the label 'Confidence in Textiles' has a brand recognition (aided recall) level of over 46% in Germany. A consumer survey by BBE Retail Experts carried out in seven European countries (Austria, Switzerland, France, Italy, Spain, Portugal, Netherlands) in 2008 found an average recognition level of 42% for the Oeko-Tex label. In a 2012 survey with 3349 participants from 13 countries (Germany, Austria, Switzerland, Spain, Italy, France, Portugal, Great Britain, Denmark, Poland, Russia, Turkey, China), the Cologne Institute for Research in Retail Issues (IFH) found a mean aided recall level of 42% as well.

STeP by Oeko-Tex 

STeP by Oeko-Tex (Sustainable Textile Production) is a worldwide certification system for environmentally friendly and socially responsible production facilities in the textile and clothing industry. STeP is a 2013 re-branding of the Oeko-Tex Standard 1000 that had been introduced in 1995. The current version of the STeP standard is available on the Oeko-Tex website.

Objective 
A STeP label is not meant to be displayed on products, but rather to be used in business-to-business communication. Given the locally different legislative regulations, STeP acts as a tool to render the sustainability and social achievements of textile facilities comparable across country borders. Via the central MySTeP database maintained by Oeko-Tex, certified facilities may make their certification data accessible to their customers along the textile chain. The guiding principle of certification according to STeP by Oeko-Tex is not a one-off optimization of environmental measures but rather the permanent improvement of overall environmental performance within a company.

Prerequisites 
Production facilities from all textile processing stages of the textile chain may apply for certification, such as fibre production, spinning, weaving and knitting facilities, textile dyeing and finishing facilities, manufacturers of accessories, foam materials or mattresses, producers of textile consumer goods or logistics centers. In the form of an online questionnaire, companies must disclose extensive information about their production conditions. The questionnaire is organized in six modules:
 Chemical management
 Environmental performance
 Environmental management
 Social responsibility
 Quality management
 Occupational health and safety
To simplify the assessment, a number of already acquired third party certifications can be taken into account, for example the ISO 14000 family of standards and EMAS for environmental management, certifications by the Fair Wear Foundation and others for social responsibility and ISO 9000 standard family for quality management.

Each module contains so-called basic and advanced questions. At least 70% of the basic questions have to be answered. Advanced questions are a chance to document additional efforts towards sustainability and social responsibility. Some mandatory basic questions constitute exclusion criteria: If these criteria are not met in their entirety, STeP certification is not possible. Among the exclusion criteria are noncompliance with the STeP standards for chemicals, sewage and emissions, child and forced labour and the prohibition of union organization.

Certification 
Following application for certification, companies receive access information to the online assessment tool. The information provided in the questionnaire is reviewed by Oeko-Tex, verified by an independent auditor from one of the Oeko-Tex member institutes during an on-site inspection, and finally analyzed and evaluated.
The STeP certificate shows the score and an individual analysis for each module as well as the overall sustainability level that combines the equally weighted results for the six modules and is ranked as follows:
 Level 1 – entry level: 70% of the basic questions (including exclusion criteria) have been satisfactorily answered
 Level 2 – good performance with further optimization potential: Additional basic questions and advanced questions answered
 Level 3 – exemplary performance: 67% or more of the advanced and remaining basic questions answered
Once issued, the STeP certificate is valid for three years.

Made in Green by Oeko-Tex 

Made in Green by Oeko-Tex is a label for textile products that are sustainably produced and have been tested for harmful substances according to the Oeko-Tex criteria. Specifically, the textile product must have undergone successful testing for compliance with the requirements of the Standard 100 by Oeko-Tex, and the product as well as the majority of its components and predecessors are produced by companies that have been audited and STeP certified by Oeko-Tex. The Made in Green label has replaced the former Oeko-Tex Standard 100plus label in 2015.

For consumer products, the Made in Green label can be awarded if 1. the end product is tested for harmful substances according to Standard 100 by Oeko-Tex, 2. all assembly facilities are STeP certified, 3. wet and chemical production facilities supplying product components that reach or exceed 5% of the total product weight are STeP certified, and 4. at least 85% of the total weight of the total product weight is supplied by STeP certified wet/chemical production facilities. This means that minor, light-weight components like sewing thread, while required to be free from harmful substances according to Standard 100, don't necessarily have to be produced in STeP certified facilities.

A unique product ID and/or QR code on the Made in Green label enables consumers to trace the production of the labelled textile article: Scanning the code or entering the product ID on the Made in Green website reveals the countries where the item was made and which production stages and facilities (provided the manufacturers have released this information) were involved in the manufacturing.

A Made in Green label expires after one year, and manufacturers need to apply for renewal of the label.

Leather Standard by Oeko-Tex 

The Leather Standard by Oeko-Tex (introduced 2017) is a system of testing methods, test criteria and limit values for harmful substances used by the Oeko-Tex member institutes to globally certify the human-ecological safety of leather products: semi-finished leather materials (“Wet blue” - chrome-tanned hides, “Wet white” - vegetable tanned hides), leather, bonded leather and ready-made leather articles. When certifying leather products that contain non-leather (e.g. textile or metallic) components, the requirements of the Leather Standard are combined with those of the Standard 100. Certification according to the Leather Standard is valid for one year.

The Leather Standard defines the same four product classes as the Standard 100. Both also employ very similar catalogues of limit values for potentially harmful chemicals. Mainly, for the Leather Standard, Oeko-Tex has adjusted the limit values for Chromium: Since industrially produced leather is predominantly chrome-tanned, higher Chromium concentrations are tolerated in leather compared to textile products.

Eco Passport by Oeko-Tex 

Eco Passport by Oeko-Tex is a certification system for textile chemicals (e.g. colourants, optical brighteners, antistatic agents, adhesives, cleaning agents). It was introduced in 2016. Chemicals awarded the Eco Passport label meet the requirements for sustainable textile production.
The certification process comprises two stages:
 Screening: Manufacturer's disclosures about product ingredients are screened for chemicals that are listed in the European Union REACh regulation's SVHC (substances of very high concern) list or in the Oeko-Tex lists of chemicals with restricted use in textile products (RSL, restricted substance list) – specified in the Standard 100 – and textile manufacturing processes (MRSL, manufacturing restricted substance list) – specified in the STeP standard. A compilation of threshold concentration requirements for groups of chemicals and individual substances is included in the Eco Passport Standard.
 Analytical verification: Compliance with the restricted substance list's threshold concentration requirements is verified in a laboratory analysis of a product probe in an Oeko-Tex member institute.
The Eco Passport by Oeko-Tex label can be issued to producers, traders and resellers of chemicals and is valid for one year.

Certification process and control tests
To have a textile or leather product certified by Oeko-Tex, manufacturers must supply samples of all components (including accessories like buttons, zips, studs, sewing threads, labels or prints) for analysis to a laboratory at one of the Oeko-Tex member institutes. The Oeko-Tex certificate is issued after successful testing of the materials for compliance with the Oeko-Tex standards and the signing of a declaration of conformity. Part of the certification process is also a company audit at the certified item's production facility, conducted shortly prior or after the issuing of the certificate. Later on, audits take place at least every three years.

To verify continued compliance with the required limit values, the Oeko-Tex Association carries out annual checks for at least 25% of all issued Standard 100 and Leather Standard certificates. These checks involve unannounced company visits and laboratory tests of labelled product samples acquired from stores and production sites. Current information about withdrawn certificates is provided on the Oeko-Tex website.

To ensure continued compliance with the requirements in the case of STeP certificates, Oeko-Tex carries out unannounced on-site visits at the production facilities.

Other services by Oeko-Tex

Detox to Zero by Oeko-Tex 

Detox to Zero is a service by Oeko-Tex that assesses the quality of a textile manufacturer's chemical management, chemicals used and waste water and sludge performance. The Detox to Zero status report is not a certificate, but a way for manufacturers to have their efforts towards reaching the goals of the Greenpeace Detox campaign verified, evaluated and documented by an independent institution.

The Detox to Zero assessment evaluates the professional and transparent management of chemicals, the reduction respectively elimination of harmful substances from the production process and the quality of waste water and sludge. The status report can be issued for production facilities that use chemicals to manufacture, dye, print, coat or otherwise treat textile materials and textile products, and for facilities that produce accessories (e.g. buttons, zips, labels) for textile products.

For Detox to Zero, Oeko-Tex has compiled a specific Manufacturing Restricted Substances List (MRSL) for waste water and sludge that states reporting limit for the content of all individual substances from the eleven substance classes that are the focus of the Greenpeace Detox campaign.

Oeko-Tex employs a web-based assessment tool for the evaluation that requires companies to provide comprehensive information and documentation about chemical management, environmental protection, employee health and safety and compliance with legal requirements regarding emissions, chemical storage and handling. Oeko-Tex demands a complete chemical inventory and chemical management documentation, information about emergency plans for chemical accidents, documents that prove employees have been trained in matters of work safety, permits/licenses for emissions, air conditioning, water and waste water facility usage, use and storage of dangerous substances, and the results of a waste water and sludge test from an accredited laboratory. Oeko-Tex will review the submitted information and verify it during an audit on the premises of the production facility.

The resulting Detox to Zero status reports the level of compliance with the Detox campaign demands and points out areas where further improvement is required. It is valid for one year; ideally, participation in the program would be continuous, with yearly performance updates.

MySTeP by Oeko-Tex 

MySTeP by Oeko-Tex is the central Oeko-Tex database that stores information about suppliers from all stages of the textile chain. Suppliers may use MySTeP to manage their Oeko-Tex certifications and their own supply chain, and to present themselves to customers and potential customers, while retaining the freedom to determine the scope of data and information that is visible to all or individual database users (mainly regarding contact information, existing Oeko-Tex certificates and audit report details). Manufacturers, brands and retailers may use MySTeP to manage their supplier relationships, compare and select suppliers that meet their sustainability demands, for visual representation of existing supply chains, to track and monitor the implementation of sustainability targets along their supply chains, and to compare their sustainability achievements to best performances and global averages.

Use of the MySTeP database is mandatory for manufacturers who wish to apply for Made in Green certification of their product(s).

Institutes
The following institutes currently belong to the International Association for Research and Testing in the Field of Textile Ecology (Oeko-Tex®): 
 AITEX, Spanish Textile Research Centre, Spain
 CENTEXBEL, Belgian Textile Research Centre, Belgium
 CENTROCOT, Centro Tessile Cotoniero e Abbigliamento S.p.A., Italy
 CITEVE, Centro Tecnológico das Indústrias Têxtil e do Vestuário de Portugal
 DTI, Danish Technological Institute, Denmark
 FILK Research Institute for Leather and Plastic Sheeting, Germany
 Hohenstein Institute, Germany
 IFTH, Institut Français du Textile et de l'Habillement, France
 INNOVATEXT, Textile Engineering and Testing Institute, Hungary
 Instytut Wlokiennictwa, Textile Research Institute, Poland
 MIRTEC, Materials Industrial Research & Technology Center, Greece
 Nissenken, Nissenken Quality Evaluation Center
 ÖTI, Institut für Ökologie, Technik und Innovation GmbH, Austria
 PFI, Testing and Research Institute Pirmasens, Germany
 Shirley Technologies Limited, United Kingdom
 SWEREA, Swedish Research Institute for Industrial Renewal and Sustainable Growth, Sweden
 Testex AG, Swiss Textile Testing Institute, Switzerland
 Vutch-Chemitex, Slovakia

References

External links
 Oeko-Tex website

Standards organisations in Switzerland
Textile industry